= George S. Eccles 2002 Legacy Bridge =

Bridge in Salt Lake City, Utah, U.S.

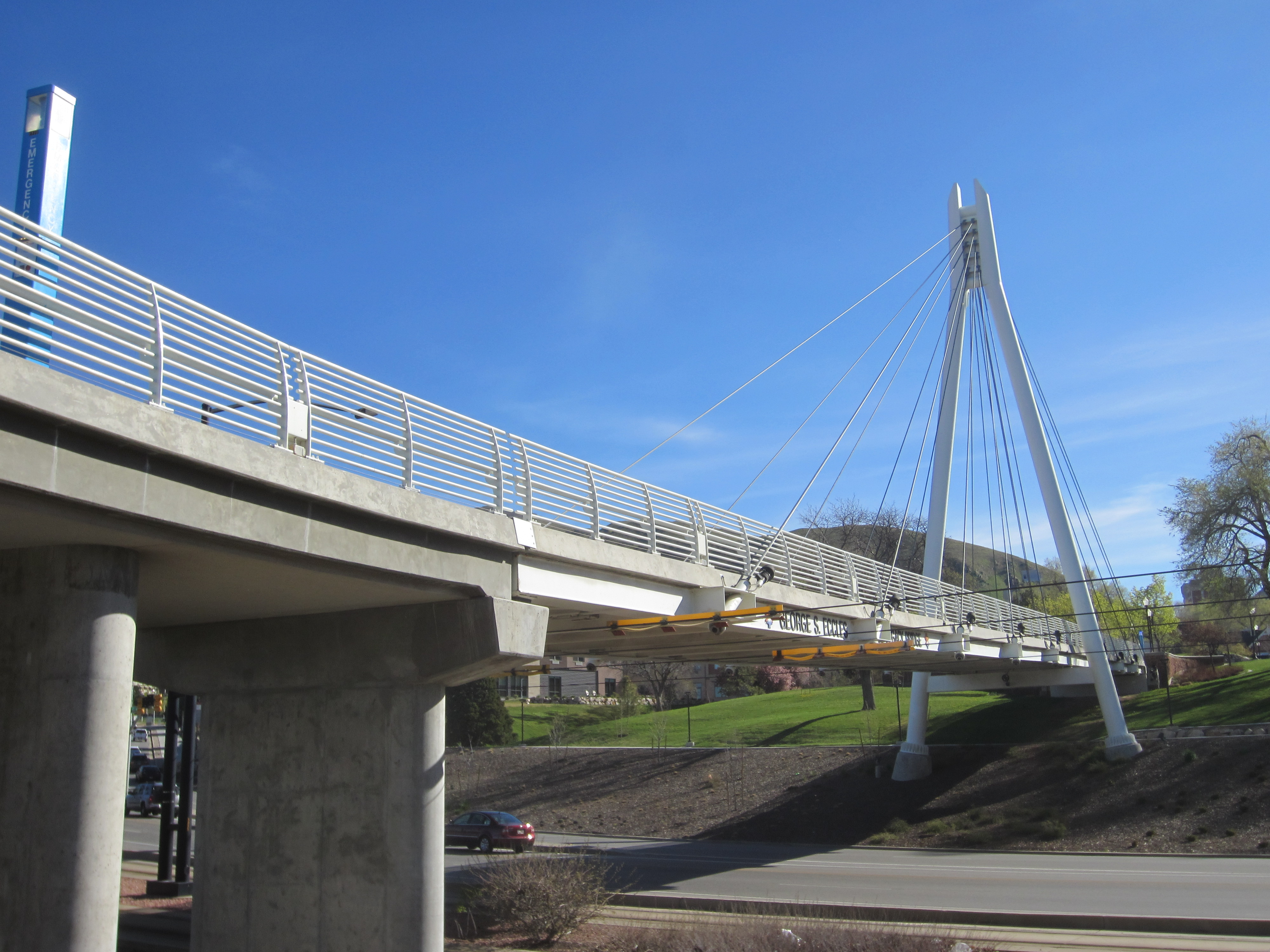
- The bridge in 2021
- Coordinates: 40°45′54.6″N 111°50′12.7″W

Location
- Interactive map of George S. Eccles 2002 Legacy Bridge

The George S. Eccles 2002 Legacy Bridge is a pedestrian bridge on the University of Utah campus in Salt Lake City, Utah, United States. The bridge was complete in 2001.
